Isaac Heinemann (Hebrew: יצחק היינמן) (born 5 June 1876; died 28 July 1957) was an Israeli rabbinical scholar and a professor of classical literature, Hellenistic literature and philology.

Biography 
Heinemann was born in Frankfurt, Germany in 1876. In 1897, he received rabbinic ordination. He emigrated to then British Mandate of Palestine, now Israel, in 1939 and joined the faculty of Hebrew University of Jerusalem.

Awards 
 In 1955, Heinemann was awarded the Israel Prize, for Jewish studies.

References

See also 
List of Israel Prize recipients
Heinemann (disambiguation)

Israeli Orthodox rabbis
20th-century Israeli rabbis
Academic staff of the Hebrew University of Jerusalem
Israel Prize in Jewish studies recipients
Israel Prize Rabbi recipients
German Orthodox rabbis
Orthodox rabbis in Mandatory Palestine
Rabbis from Frankfurt
1876 births
1957 deaths